Rigby Graham MBE  (2 February 1931 – 7 May 2015) was an English landscape and topographical artist who worked within the English Romanticism tradition.

Life and career
Graham trained as a mural painter at the Leicester College of Art. After teaching at a number of local schools, Graham returned to lecture at the College of Art, firstly in Graphic Design and Printing, then in Education and latterly in Bookbinding. Graham illustrated more than 250 books and pamphlets and wrote extensively on art and artists. Graham retired from teaching in 1983.

Writings and works
Holt Mill Papers Peter and Donna Thomas, Santa Cruz, 1994
Kippers and Sawdust The Old Style Press, Landogo, 1992 B00157WQ7M
Romantic Book Illustration in England 1943-55 Private Libraries Assn 1965 B0000CH197
John Minton 1917-57, A Selective Retrospective Oriel 31, 1993 
Examples of Rigby Graham paintings and art

References

External links

A digital biography of Rigby Graham 
Doctor of Letters Degree Award -Oration

1931 births
2015 deaths
Academics of De Montfort University
Alumni of De Montfort University
Members of the Order of the British Empire
English artists